Dorcadion ortrudae is a species of beetle in the family Cerambycidae. It was described by Walter Braun in 1978. It is known from Turkey.

References

ortrudae
Beetles described in 1978